Knattspyrnufélagið Kári, commonly known as Kári, is an Icelandic football club from the town of Akranes. The club's football team is playing in the fourth tier of Icelandic football.

References

External links 
 Kári – Official website

Football clubs in Iceland
Association football clubs established in 1922
1922 establishments in Iceland
Akranes